Simon McCrory (born 1987 in Belfast, Northern Ireland) is an Irish sportsperson.  He plays hurling with his local club St. John's and has been a member of the Antrim senior inter-county hurling team since 2007.

References

1988 births
Living people
St John's (Antrim) hurlers
Antrim inter-county hurlers